() is a revolutionary and war song written by Étienne Méhul (music) and Marie-Joseph Chénier (words) in 1794. It was the official anthem of the French Empire, and it is currently the unofficial regional anthem of French Guiana and the presidential anthem of France.

The song was nicknamed "the brother of the Marseillaise" by Republican soldiers.

The song was first performed on 14 July 1794. 18,000 copies of the music sheets were immediately printed and distributed to the army. Its original title was "Anthem to Liberty"; it was changed to its present title by Robespierre.  

The song is a musical tableau: each of the seven stanzas is sung by a different character or group of characters:
 The first stanza is the discourse of a deputy cheering his soldiers and encouraging them for the fight for the Republic.
 The second stanza is the song of a mother offering the life of her son to the fatherland.
 The fourth stanza is sung by children exalting Joseph Agricol Viala and Joseph Bara, children aged 12 and 13, respectively, who had died for Revolutionary France. According to legend, Bara was surrounded by royalist Vendeans, when he was ordered to shout "Long live Louis XVII"; he shouted "Long live the Republic" instead and was executed on the spot. Viala was killed by a bullet as he was trying to sabotage an enemy bridge. His last words were "I die, but I die for the Republic."

The song is still in the repertoire of the French Army. It was sung during World War I. Valéry Giscard d'Estaing used it as his campaign song for the presidential election of 1974; as a president, he often had it played by troops along with the "Marseillaise".

Lyrics
Un député du Peuple
1. La victoire en chantant
Nous ouvre la barrière.
La Liberté guide nos pas.
Et du Nord au Midi
La trompette guerrière
A sonné l'heure des combats.
Tremblez ennemis de la France
Rois ivres de sang et d'orgueil.
Le Peuple souverain s'avance,
Tyrans descendez au cercueil.

Chant des guerriers (Refrain)
La République nous appelle
Sachons vaincre ou sachons périr
Un Français doit vivre pour elle
Pour elle un Français doit mourir.
Un Français doit vivre pour elle
Pour elle un Français doit mourir.

Une mère de famille
2. De nos yeux maternels ne craignez pas les larmes :
Loin de nous de lâches douleurs!
Nous devons triompher quand vous prenez les armes:
C'est aux rois à verser des pleurs.
Nous vous avons donné la vie,
Guerriers, elle n'est plus à vous;
Tous vos jours sont à la patrie:
Elle est votre mère avant nous.
(Refrain)

Deux vieillards
3. Que le fer paternel arme la main des braves;
Songez à nous au champ de Mars;
Consacrez dans le sang des rois et des esclaves
Le fer béni par vos vieillards;
Et, rapportant sous la chaumière
Des blessures et des vertus,
Venez fermer notre paupière
Quand les tyrans ne seront plus.
(Refrain)

Un enfant
4. De Barra, de Viala le sort nous fait envie ;
Ils sont morts, mais ils ont vaincu.
Le lâche accablé d'ans n'a point connu la vie:
Qui meurt pour le peuple a vécu.
Vous êtes vaillants, nous le sommes:
Guidez-nous contre les tyrans;
Les républicains sont des hommes,
Les esclaves sont des enfants.
(Refrain)

Une épouse
5. Partez, vaillants époux; les combats sont vos fêtes;
Partez, modèles des guerriers;
Nous cueillerons des fleurs pour en ceindre vos têtes:
Nos mains tresserons vos lauriers.
Et, si le temple de mémoire
S'ouvrait à vos mânes vainqueurs,
Nos voix chanterons votre gloire,
Nos flancs porteront vos vengeurs.
(Refrain)

Une jeune fille
6. Et nous, sœurs des héros, nous qui de l'hyménée
Ignorons les aimables nœuds;
Si, pour s'unir un jour à notre destinée,
Les citoyens forment des vœux,
Qu'ils reviennent dans nos murailles
Beaux de gloire et de liberté,
Et que leur sang, dans les batailles,
Ait coulé pour l'égalité.
(Refrain)

Trois guerriers
7. Sur le fer devant Dieu, nous jurons à nos pères,
À nos épouses, à nos sœurs,
À nos représentants, à nos fils, à nos mères,
D'anéantir les oppresseurs:
En tous lieux, dans la nuit profonde,
Plongeant l'infâme royauté,
Les Français donneront au monde
Et la paix et la liberté.
(Refrain)
A deputy of the People
1. Victory singing
Opens for us the gates
Liberty guides our steps
And from the North to the South
The war trumpet
Signals the hour of the fight
Tremble, enemies of France
Kings drunk on blood and pride
The sovereign People comes forth
Tyrants go down to your graves.

Song of the Warriors (Chorus)
The Republic is calling us
Let us prevail or let us perish
A Frenchman must live for her
For her a Frenchman must die
A Frenchman must live for her
For her a Frenchman must die.

A mother of a family
2. Do not fear that our motherly eyes should weep
From us begone, cowardly grief!
We must triumph when you bear arms
It is kings who have to weep
We gave you life
Warriors, it is no longer yours
All your days belong to the Motherland
It is your mother above us.
(Chorus)

Two old men
3. May the fatherly iron arm, the hand of the braves
Think of us on the Field of Mars
Bless with the blood of the kings and of the slaves
The arms blessed by your elder
And bringing back home
Wounds and virtues
Come and close our lids
When tyrants are no more.
(Chorus)

A child
4. The fates of Barra and Viala fill us with envy
They died, but they prevailed
The coward plagued with years never experienced life
He who dies for the People has lived
You are brave, we are too
Guide us against Tyrants
Republicans are men
Slaves are children.
(Chorus)

A wife
5. Leave, valiant husbands! Battles are your feasts
Leave, models for warriors
We shall pick flowers to crown your heads
Our hands shall braid laurels
And if the temple of memory
Should open for your victorious manes
Our voices shall sing your glory
Our wombs shall bear your avengers.
(Chorus)

A young girl
6. And we, sister of the heroes, we who of Hymenaios
Ignore the loveable knots
If, for uniting themselves some day with our destiny
A citizen would express the wish
Let them come back in our walls
Embellished with glory and liberty
And that their blood, in battles
Would have been spilled for equality.
(Chorus)

Three warriors
7. On the iron, before God, we swear to our fathers
To our wives, to our sisters
To our representatives, to our sons, to our mothers
That we shall annihilate oppressors
Everywhere, into the deep night
By sinking the infamous royalty
The French shall give to the world
And peace and liberty.
(Chorus)

References

External links

French anthems
Historical national anthems
Songs of the French Revolution
Compositions by Étienne Méhul
French patriotic songs
1794 compositions
French military marches
National anthem compositions in E major